Madeleine Darke (born 30 March 2001) is an Australian cricketer who plays as a wicket-keeper and right-handed batter for Western Australia in the Women's National Cricket League (WNCL) and Perth Scorchers in the Women's Big Bash League (WBBL).

Darke previously played for Sydney Sixers, New South Wales and Melbourne Stars, and appeared for Australia A during their tour of England in 2019.

On 15 November 2020, in the WBBL match against the Adelaide Strikers, Darke replaced Ashleigh Gardner as a concussion substitute.

References

External links

Maddy Darke at Cricket Australia

2001 births
Living people
Cricketers from Sydney
Australian women cricketers
Melbourne Stars (WBBL) cricketers
New South Wales Breakers cricketers
Sydney Sixers (WBBL) cricketers
Western Australia women cricketers